George Read (September 18, 1733 – September 21, 1798) was an American politician from New Castle in New Castle County, Delaware. He was a Continental Congressman from Delaware, a delegate to the U.S. Constitutional Convention of 1787, president of Delaware, and a member of the Federalist Party. In addition, Read served as U.S. Senator from Delaware and chief justice of Delaware.

Read was a Founding Father of the United States, one of only two statesmen who signed four of the great state papers on which the country's founding is based: Petition to the King and Continental Association, both passed by the Congress of 1774, as well as the Declaration of Independence in 1776 and Constitution of the United States in 1787.

Father

Read was the son of John and Mary (Howell) Read. John Read was born in Dublin, Ireland, the son of an Englishman of large fortune belonging to the family of Read of Berkshire, Hertfordshire, and Oxfordshire. The death of his beloved having left him bereft, John Read came to the American colonies and, with a view of diverting his mind, entered into extensive enterprises in Maryland and Delaware.

Soon after his arrival in America, John Read purchased a large estate in Cecil County, Maryland, and founded with six associates the city of Charlestown on the headwaters of Chesapeake Bay, with the intention of creating a new market for the northern trade. They developed northern Maryland and built up the neighboring iron works of the Principio Company, in which the older generations of the Washington family, and at a later period General George Washington, were also largely interested.

As an original proprietor of Charlestown, John Read was appointed by the colonial legislature of Maryland one of the commissioners to lay it out and govern it. He held various military offices during his life, and in his later years resided on his plantation in New Castle County.

Early life
George Read was born at Cecil County, Maryland, on September 18, 1733. When he was an infant, the family moved to New Castle County, Delaware, settling near the village of Christiana. As he grew up, Read joined Thomas McKean at the Rev. Francis Allison's Academy at New London, Pennsylvania, and then studied law in Philadelphia with John Moland. He was admitted to the Pennsylvania Bar in 1753, and a year later he returned home to establish a practice at New Castle.

In 1763 he married Gertrude Ross Till, daughter of the Rev. George Ross, the Anglican rector of Immanuel Church in New Castle and widowed sister of George Ross, also a future signer of the Declaration of Independence. They had four children, John, George Jr., William, and Mary, who married Matthew Pearce (she is often confused with her paternal aunt, Mary Read, who in 1769 married Gunning Bedford, Sr., a future Governor of Delaware). They lived on The Strand in New Castle, and their house was in what is now the garden of the present Read House and Gardens, owned by the Delaware Historical Society. They were members of Immanuel Episcopal Church.

In 1763 John Penn, the proprietary governor, appointed Read crown attorney general for the three Delaware counties, and he served in that position until leaving for the Continental Congress in 1774. He also served in the Colonial Assembly of the lower Delaware counties for twelve sessions, from 1764/65 through 1775/76.

American Revolution

Eighteenth-century Delaware was politically divided into loose factions known as the "Court Party" and the "Country Party." The majority Court Party was generally Anglican, strongest in Kent and Sussex Counties, worked well with the colonial proprietary government and was in favor of reconciliation with the British government. The minority Country Party was largely Ulster-Scot, centered in New Castle County, and quickly advocated independence from the British. Read was often the leader of the Court party faction, and as such he generally worked in opposition to Caesar Rodney and his friend and neighbor Thomas McKean.

Read, like most other people in Delaware, was in favor of trying to reconcile differences with Great Britain. He opposed the Stamp Act and similar measures of Parliament but supported anti-importation measures and dignified protests. He was quite reluctant to pursue the option of outright independence. Nevertheless, from 1764 he led the Delaware Committee of Correspondence and was elected to serve along with the more radical McKean and Rodney in the First and Second Continental Congress from 1774 to 1777. He was frequently absent, and when the Congress voted on American Independence on July 2, 1776, Read surprised many by voting against it. That meant that Rodney had to ride overnight to Philadelphia to break the deadlock in Delaware's delegation for independence. However, when the Declaration of Independence was finally adopted, Read signed it despite his caution.

Government of Delaware
Anticipating the Declaration of Independence, the General Assembly of the lower counties declared its separation from the British government on June 15, 1776, in the New Castle Court House. Once the Declaration of Independence was actually adopted, the General Assembly called for elections to a Delaware constitutional convention to draft a constitution for the new state. Read was elected to this convention, became its president, and guided the passage of the McKean-drafted document, which became the Delaware Constitution of 1776.

Read was elected to the first Legislative Council of the Delaware General Assembly and was selected as the speaker in both the 1776/77 and 1777/78 sessions. At the time of the capture of President John McKinly, Read was in Philadelphia attending Congress; after narrowly escaping capture himself while he was returning home, he became president on October 20, 1777, serving until March 31, 1778. The British occupied Philadelphia and were in control of the Delaware River. Read tried, mostly in vain, to recruit additional soldiers and to protect the state from raiders from Philadelphia and off ships in the Delaware River. The Delaware General Assembly session of 1777/78 had to be moved to Dover, Delaware, for safety, and the Sussex County General Assembly delegation was never seated because disruptions at the polls had negated the election results.

After Rodney was elected to replace him as president, Read continued to serve in the Legislative Council until the 1778–79 session. After a one-year rest nursing ill health, he was elected to the House of Assembly for the 1780/81 and 1781/82 sessions. He returned to the Legislative Council in the 1782/83 session and served two terms until the 1787/88 session. On December 5, 1782, he was elected judge of the Court of Appeals in Cases of Capture.

Federalist

Read was again called to national service in 1786 when he represented Delaware at the Annapolis Convention. Because so few states were represented, this meeting produced only a report calling for a broader convention to be held in Philadelphia the next year. At what became the Constitutional Convention, Read again represented Delaware. Quoting from Wright & Morris in their Soldier-Statesmen of the Constitution,

Read immediately argued for a new national government under a new Constitution, saying 'to amend the Articles was simply putting old cloth on a new garment.' He was a leader in the fight for a strong central government, advocating, at one time, the abolition of the states altogether and the consolidation of the country under one powerful national government. 'Let no one fear the states, the people are with us;' he declared to a Convention shocked by this radical proposal. With no one to support his motion, he settled for protecting the rights of the small states against the infringements of their larger, more populous neighbors who, he feared, would 'probably combine to swallow up the smaller ones by addition, division or impoverishment.' He warned that Delaware 'would become at once a cipher in the union' if the principle of equal representation embodied in the New Jersey (small-state) Plan was not adopted and if the method of amendment in the Articles was not retained. He favored giving Congress the power to veto state laws, making the federal legislature immune to popular whims by having senators hold office for nine years or during good behavior, and granting the U.S. President broad appointive powers. Outspoken, he threatened to lead the Delaware delegation out of the Convention if the rights of the small states were not specifically guaranteed in the new Constitution.

Once the rights were assured, he led the ratification movement in Delaware, which, partly as a result of his efforts, became the first state to ratify and did so unanimously.

Senator
Following the adoption of the U.S. Constitution, the Delaware General Assembly elected Read as one of its two U.S. Senators. His term began on March 4, 1789, and he was reelected in 1791 but resigned on September 18, 1793. Read served with the Pro-Administration Party majority in the First and Second Congress, under President Washington. He supported the assumption of state debts, establishment of a national bank, and the imposition of excise taxes. He resigned to accept an appointment as chief justice of the Delaware Supreme Court and served in that capacity until his death.

Read's resignation from the Senate was before the first session of the Third Congress assembled, but it was not until February 7, 1795, four weeks before it adjourned, that Henry Latimer was elected to replace him. One of Delaware's Senate seats was, therefore, vacant from September 18, 1793, until February 7, 1795.

Death and legacy

 
Read died at New Castle on September 21, 1798, from heart problems and is buried there in the Immanuel Episcopal Church Cemetery.

William T. Read in his Life and Correspondence describes Read as "tall, slightly and gracefully formed, with pleasing features and lustrous brown eyes. His manners were dignified, bordering upon austerity, but courteous, and at times captivating. He commanded entire confidence, not only from his profound legal knowledge, sound judgment, and impartial decisions but from his severe integrity and the purity of his private character." However, a fellow delegate to the Constitutional Convention of 1787 noted that "his legal abilities are said to be very great, but his powers of oratory are fatiguing and tiresome to the last degree; his voice is feeble and his articulation so bad that few can have patience to attend him." Historians like John Monroe have generally recognized that all in all, Read was the dominating figure in Delaware politics during his career, directly or indirectly providing consistent and reliable leadership to the new state.

His home, Stonum, is a historic landmark. There is a school in New Castle and a dorm at the University of Delaware named for Read.

In popular culture
In the Broadway musical 1776, Read is portrayed in a minor role as a proper, conservative, somewhat effete, and wealthy planter who has difficulty getting along with the other two members of the Delaware contingent who are for Independence. Duane Bodin played the character in the original Broadway cast and Leo Leyden appeared in the film version.

Family
Read's brother Thomas was an officer in the Continental Navy during the war. Another brother, James, was an officer in the Continental Army and was later active in managing the navy under the Articles of Confederation. Read's son George Read Jr. served as the first U.S. Attorney for Delaware, and his grandson George Read III served as the second. Another son, John, was a noted lawyer and banker of Philadelphia. Read's great-granddaughter, Louisa, married Major Benjamin Kendrick Pierce, the brother of future President Franklin Pierce.

Positions held
Elections for the Delaware General Assembly were held on October 1, and members took office on October 20 or the following weekday. The colonial attorney general was appointed by the Crown. The Legislative Council was created in 1776, and its councilmen had a three-year term. State assemblymen had a one-year term. The whole General Assembly chose the Continental Congressmen for a one-year term and the state president for a three-year term. Read served as interim state president, filling the vacancy created by the resignation of McKean. The chief justice of the state Supreme Court was also selected by the General Assembly for the life of the person appointed. The General Assembly chose the U.S. Senators, who took office March 4 for a six-year term. However, Read's first term was only two years to establish a rotation.

See also
 Memorial to the 56 Signers of the Declaration of Independence

Notes

References

External links
 Biographical Directory of the United States Congress
 Biography by Russell Pickett
 Delaware's Governors
 The Political Graveyard
 Hall of Governors Portrait Gallery; Portrait courtesy of Historical and Cultural Affairs, Dover.
 Delaware Historical Society; website
 University of Delaware; Library website
 Read House and Gardens
 Immanuel Episcopal Church

1733 births
1798 deaths
People from Cecil County, Maryland
People of colonial Maryland
People of colonial Delaware
American people of English descent
Episcopalians from Maryland
Continental Congressmen from Delaware
Signers of the Continental Association
Signers of the United States Declaration of Independence
Signers of the United States Constitution
Pro-Administration Party United States senators from Delaware
Delaware Federalists
Delaware Independents
Governors of Delaware
Independent state governors of the United States
Members of the Delaware House of Representatives
Delaware state senators
Chief Justices of Delaware
American slave owners
People from New Castle, Delaware
Delaware lawyers
Burials in New Castle County, Delaware
United States senators who owned slaves
Founding Fathers of the United States